María Quiñones Carrillo is a Mexican basket maker, who  has been named a “grand master” of Mexican handcrafts by the Fomento Cultural Banamex.

Quiñones Carrillo learned the craft from her mother growing up in Otovachi, Chihuahua in a basket making family. She has passed on her knowledge to her daughters as well as other interested young people.

She alternates this work with farm chores, working with plants she gathers from nearby, making baskets, tortilla holders and more to sell mostly in the local area.

Her most common raw material is a kind of palm leaf called sotol, but she also uses yucca leaves, séleke fiber and other palms. She realizes the entire process from the cutting of plants to the finished product, with her only tool a knife. Most of her work follows traditional designs but some are variations that she has created.

References

Mexican artists
Living people
Year of birth missing (living people)
Basket weavers
People from Chihuahua (state)
Women basketweavers